Nevena Vujadinović (born 1990) is a politician in Serbia. She has served in the National Assembly of Serbia since October 2020 as a member of the Serbian Progressive Party.

Private career
Vujadinović has a master's degree in special education. She lives in Sombor.

Politician
Vujadinović received the 189th position on the Progressive Party's Aleksandar Vučić — For Our Children electoral list for the 2020 Serbian parliamentary election and narrowly missed direct election when the list won a landslide majority with 188 out of 250 mandates. She was awarded a mandate on 28 October 2020 as the replacement for another party member who had resigned. She is the leader of Serbia's parliamentary friendship group with South Sudan and a member of the parliamentary friendship groups with Canada, Egypt, Greece, Norway, Russia, Spain, and the United Arab Emirates.

References

1990 births
Living people
Politicians from Sombor
Members of the National Assembly (Serbia)
Serbian Progressive Party politicians